The Iceberg/Freedom of Speech... Just Watch What You Say! is the third studio album by American rapper Ice-T, released on October 10, 1989, by Sire Records. The album has an uncharacteristically gritty sound, featuring some of the darkest tracks that Ice-T ever released.

Background
The album was released after Ice-T was encountering censorship problems on tour. In The Ice Opinion: Who Gives a Fuck? the rapper states that "People had already told me what I could not say onstage in Columbus, Georgia. You couldn't say anything they called a 'swear' word. You couldn't touch yourself. They were using the same tactics they used on everyone from Elvis and Jim Morrison to 2 Live Crew".

The album's cover, featuring a B-boy with a shotgun shoved in his mouth, and two pistols pressed against each side of his head, reflected Ice-T's experiences with the concept of freedom of speech. "The concept of that picture is, 'Go ahead and say what you want. But here comes the government and here come the parents, and they are ready to destroy you when you open your mouth'".

Lyrical themes
"The Iceberg" alternates between typical violent metaphor, outlandish boasts, and comical sexual situations involving other members of Ice's Rhyme Syndicate. "Lethal Weapon" tells listeners that the mind is the most powerful weapon:

"You Played Yourself" advises listeners to be smart and not let themselves "be played". "Peel Their Caps Back" is about committing a drive-by to avenge a slain friend. Unlike other songs where violence is a metaphor for the rapper's ability to defeat other rappers lyrically, this song is a stark depiction of what could lead to such an event. However, it contains two surprising elements: in the end, the main character is killed, and the whole event is written off by the media as just another gang killing.

In "The Girl Tried to Kill Me", Ice-T raps about an encounter with a dominatrix:

"Black and Decker" starts off with Rhyme Syndicate members complaining about the media's portrayal of their work as meaningless violence. Ice wonders aloud what it would sound like if you drilled into someone's head with a power drill. After some gory sound effects, Ice says "Probably sound like that." "Hit the Deck" offers sincere advice to wannabe-MCs:

"This One's for Me" offers Ice's take on the rap scene and music industry. "The Hunted Child" is a first-person account of a scared young gangbanger on the run. The busy, multi-layered composition, with its scratched sirens and staccato drums, samples Public Enemy's "Bring the Noise".

"What Ya Wanna Do" is a 9-minute party song featuring several members of the Syndicate, including a young Everlast, who became famous as a member of House of Pain. "Freedom of Speech" was one of the first raps to focus on the First Amendment and in particular attacked Tipper Gore's PMRC with unmistakable venom:

The album ends with in "My Word Is Bond", featuring Syndicate members telling one exaggerated story after another against a looped sample of Slick Rick saying "Stop lying" from his song "La Di Da Di".

Accompanying VHS
The album was accompanied by a VHS entitled The Iceberg.  This mixed footage of Ice-T's gigs with his own commentary.  In the first section, he said that some of the footage was of poor quality because it was filmed on equipment from a pawnbroker or stolen from a mall.  The video featured some footage of the Dope Jam tour, including Doug E Fresh, KRS-One and Kool Moe Dee.

Track listing

Sample credits
"Shut Up, Be Happy" contains a sample of "Black Sabbath (song)" performed by "Black Sabbath".
"Hit the Deck" contains a sample of "Coonskin No More" performed by Scatman Crothers.
"The Hunted Child" contains a sample of "Bring the Noise" performed by Public Enemy.
"My Word Is Bond" contains a sample of "La Di Da Di" performed by Slick Rick.

Personnel 
Afrika Islam - producer, programming (tracks 1, 3–13)
Arnold Turner - photographer
Beat Master V - drums (track 6)
Devious Doze - artwork
D.J. Evil "E" The Great - scratches
Ernie C - guitar (track 6, 11)
Ice-T - main artist, executive producer, producer
Johnny (Sleepy John) Rivers - programming (track 2)
Lloyd Roberts - bass (tracks 8, 11)
Mark Wolfson - engineer mix
Mary Ann Dibs - design
Vachik Aghaniawtz - engineer mix

Charts

Certifications

References

1989 albums
Albums produced by Afrika Islam
Ice-T albums
Sire Records albums